Under the Blade is the debut studio album by American heavy metal band Twisted Sister, released on Secret Records in September 1982. It was produced by UFO/Waysted bassist Pete Way and featured an aggressive and hard-hitting sound, which was eventually ignored on a remixed re-release by Atlantic Records on June 13, 1985. The re-release also added a remixed version of the song "I'll Never Grow Up, Now!", the band's long forgotten 1979 single. The Atlantic Records release was both an attempt to cash in on the commercial success of Stay Hungry and, by then (and for years to come), the only official way to get the album as Secret Records was no more. However, bootlegs with the original mix were still in circulation. On May 31, 2016, Eagle Records re-released Under the Blade in a digital remastered form with the original mix finally restored. Under the Blade has sold over two million copies worldwide.

The track "Bad Boys of Rock 'N Roll" is a new recording of a track that appeared earlier on the 1981 compilation "Homegrown Album"

Critical reception 

In a long article about '80s metal, Tim Holmes of Rolling Stone wrote a contemporary review about Twisted Sister describing them as "the clown heir apparent to the gaping vacancy left by Alice Cooper" and a band who "write(s) songs that have a giddy, street-smart narrative approach and a gritty coherence that metal usually lacks." He also wrote that Under the Blade "is not technically a new album but rather a remix for modern ears" of older music.

Modern reviews are very positive. Greg Prato of AllMusic reminds how the band moved to the UK, which was having a "heavy metal resurgence (dubbed the New Wave of British Heavy Metal)", to record with UFO bassist Pete Way "many of the band's best compositions from their club days" and finds Under the Blade "one of Twisted Sister's hardest rocking albums... highly recommended to lovers of early-'80s British heavy metal." Also Exclaim! reviewer Ian Gormely considers the album "a must for anyone with an interest in the history of American hard rock". Despite "the raw production... and lack of an obvious hit... it laid the groundwork for their future success", thanks also to Twisted Sister's "tongue-in-cheek presentation that latter-day hair metal bands clearly lacked." Adrian Begrand of PopMatters reviews the album as a "near-classic" and "the most ferocious of the band's career." He writes that the musicians may have "bar band roots", but on the album "the fun side of Twisted Sister is set aside in favor of something a lot darker", which brought to "a hell of a debut that not only connected with British heavy metal fans, but would eventually lead to a contract with Atlantic Records, paving the way to stardom a couple years later." Canadian journalist Martin Popoff considers Under the Blade "dead serious despite the garish imagery, a good four-fifths of it rocking with hellacious clout, attitude and clever economy" and remarks how the influence of Judas Priest is evident in Dee Snider's compositions.

The album was ranked #24 on Metal Rules list of "The Top 50 Glam Metal Albums.

In 1985 the member of the PMRC committee Tipper Gore (wife of Senator Al Gore),  found that the song "Under the Blade" referred to "sadomasochism, bondage, and rape", promoting violence, while Dee Snider testified at the Congress panel hearings that it was "about surgery, and the fear that it instills in people", concluding that "the only sadomasochism, bondage, and rape in this song is in the mind of Ms. Gore."

In 2005, Under the Blade was ranked number 387 in Rock Hard magazine's book The 500 Greatest Rock & Metal Albums of All Time.

Track listing

Special edition 
The special edition, released on CD, contains the original album, the complete and remastered Ruff Cuts EP, and an edited live version of "Shoot 'Em Down" from a UK sampler called "Reading Rock Volume One".
Also, the appearance of Twisted Sister at the 1982 Reading Festival is on a bonus DVD, together with interviews from the band members.

 "What You Don't Know (Sure Can Hurt You)" – 4:46
 "Bad Boys (Of Rock 'n' Roll)" – 3:21
 "Run for Your Life" – 3:28
 "Sin After Sin" – 3:22
 "Shoot 'Em Down" – 3:54
 "Destroyer" – 4:09
 "Under the Blade" – 4:38
 "Tear It Loose" – 3:09
 "Day of the Rocker" – 5:02††
 "What You Don't Know (Sure Can Hurt You)" – 5:32†
 "Shoot 'Em Down" – 3:56†
 "Under the Blade" – 4:41†
 "Leader of the Pack" – 4:01†
 "Shoot 'Em Down (live)" – 3:37

†from the 1982 Ruff Cutts EP

††"Day of the Rocker" contains few seconds extra after fade out (4:55 to 5:02) with the final phrase "Rock, Rock, Rock!"

Personnel 
Band members
Dee Snider – lead vocals, assistant producer
Eddie "Fingers" Ojeda – lead & rhythm guitar, backing vocals
Jay Jay French – rhythm & lead guitar, backing vocals
Mark "The Animal" Mendoza – bass, backing vocals, assistant producer, remix producer, engineer
A. J. Pero – drums, percussion
Joey Brighton – drums (tracks 10, 11 on Special edition)
Tony Petri – drums (side b track 4 on re-issue 1985 edition; tracks 12, 13 on Special edition)

Guest musician
"Fast" Eddie Clarke – second guitar solo on "Tear It Loose"

Production
Pete Way – producer, executive producer
Will Gosling, Craig Thomson, Dave Boscombe – engineers, mixing
Mark Mendoza, Danny McNerney – 1985 remix engineers
Fin Costello – cover concept and photography

Charts

References 

1982 debut albums
Twisted Sister albums
Atlantic Records albums
Secret Records albums